The urban bent-toed gecko (Cyrtodactylus urbanus) is a species of gecko endemic to India.

References

 http://reptile-database.reptarium.cz/species?genus=Cyrtodactylus&species=urbanus

Reptiles of India
Cyrtodactylus
Reptiles described in 2020
Taxa named by Jayaditya Purkayastha
Taxa named by Madhurima Das
Taxa named by Sanath Chandra Bohra
Taxa named by Aaron M. Bauer
Taxa named by Ishan Agarwal